Communion under both kinds in Christianity is the reception under both "species" (i.e., both the consecrated bread and wine) of the Eucharist. Denominations of Christianity that hold to a doctrine of Communion under both kinds may believe that a Eucharist which does not include both bread and wine as elements of the religious ceremony is not valid, while others may consider the presence of both bread and wine as preferable, but not necessary, for the ceremony. In some traditions, grape juice may take the place of wine with alcohol content as the second element.

Roman Catholicism

Doctrine
In reference to the Eucharist as a sacrifice, Communion under both kinds belongs at least to the integrity and essence, of the rite, and may not be omitted without violating the precept of Christ: "Do this in remembrance of me" (Luke 22:19). This is mentioned implicitly by the Council of Trent (Sess. XXI, c. i; XXII, c. i), and the General Instruction of the Roman Missal states that the people "should share the cup when it is permitted. Then, Communion is a clearer sign of sharing in the sacrifice that is actually being celebrated."

Practice

Catholicism teaches that Christ is sacramentally (and equally) present under each species, and therefore if a person receives only one species, Christ is fully present and nothing is lacking.

In the Early Church, Communion was ordinarily administered and received under both kinds. That such was the practice mentioned by Paul in I Corinthians 11:28. But side by side in the Early Church there existed the custom of communicating in certain cases under one kind alone e.g. when people took home some of the Eucharist after Sunday worship and communicated during the week and also when the Eucharist was brought to the sick.

By the Middle Ages, the Church had become, like most of European society, increasingly hierarchical. There was much stress on being holy when receiving Communion, and a greatly heightened appreciation of the sufferings of Christ. This meant that all who approached the altar were to be as pure as possible, and inevitably led to the exclusion of the laity from administering the Eucharist, reserving the practice to the clergy. It is difficult to say when the practice of offering the chalice to the people stopped, but it may be presumed that this was part of the way in which Church authorities sought to prevent anything disrespectful happening to the Eucharist; it was also, by this time, that Communion was given only on the tongue.

This practice was challenged by the Bohemian reformer, Jacob of Mies, who in 1414 began to offer Communion under both kinds to his congregation in the Church of St. Martin in the Wall. The matter was reviewed by the 13th Session of the Council of Constance, in 1415; the council rejected the grounds for offering the chalice to lay people and banned the practice. This became the most emblematic issue of the Hussite Wars, which resulted in the permission of the communion under both kinds for Utraquists in Bohemia in 1433 (it would be banned again in 1627 and allowed again by the Patent of Toleration in 1781). In the following century, this was challenged again by the Protestant Reformers, including Martin Luther, John Calvin and Huldrych Zwingli. The Council of Trent referred to the pope the question whether the petition of the Holy Roman Emperor to have the use of the chalice allowed in his dominions be granted; in 1564 Pius IV did grant this permission to some German bishops, provided certain conditions were fulfilled. However, his concession was withdrawn in the following year.

In the 20th century, Catholic liturgical reformers began to press for a return to Communion under both kinds, citing the practice of the church before the thirteenth century. There were spirited debates over the issue at the Second Vatican Council, resulting in a compromise. The following text was finally issued by the bishops; "communion under both kinds may be granted when the bishops think fit, not only to clerics and religious, but also to the laity, in cases to be determined by the Apostolic See, as for instance, to the newly ordained in the Mass of their sacred ordination, to the newly professed in the Mass of their religious profession, and to the newly baptized in the Mass which follows their baptism". Regular use of Communion under both kinds requires the permission of the bishop, but bishops in many countries have given blanket authorisation to administer Holy Communion in this way. In the United States, the Notre Dame Study of Catholic Parish Life showed that by 1989, slightly less than half of the parishes in its survey offered the chalice to their congregations.

Eastern Orthodoxy
(Also applicable to the appropriate Eastern Catholic Churches.)

The Eastern Orthodox Church has consistently practised communion under both kinds. Both the clergy and the people normally receive in both kinds.

Doctrine
Communion of only the Eucharistic Bread is seen as imperfect by the Orthodox churches, who do not normally follow this practice, even in extremis.

Practice
During the celebration of the Divine Liturgy, when it comes time for Holy Communion, the Lamb (a leavened Host) is first broken into four pieces: one portion is placed whole into the chalice; from one portion the clergy receive communion; and from the remaining two portions, the laity are Communed. The clergy will each receive first the Body of Christ, taking it in their hands, and then sip from the chalice. After the communion of the clergy, the portions of the consecrated Lamb for the faithful (i.e., the congregation) are cut into tiny portions and placed in the chalice. When the faithful come forward to receive Communion, they cross their hands over their chest, and the priest gives them both the Body and Blood of Christ from the chalice, using a spoon. In this manner, everyone receives in both kinds, but no one takes either the consecrated Bread or the Chalice in their hands, thus reducing the possibility of crumbs accidentally being dropped or any of the Blood of Christ being spilt on the floor.

When the priest takes Holy Communion to the sick, he transfers a portion to a vessel which is worn around the neck. Inside the vessel are compartments for a gilded box to contain the Mysteries, a tiny chalice, a bottle for wine, a small gilded spoon and often a gilded set of tweezers. Once at the sick person's bedside he uses the tweezers to take a particle of the Mysteries from the box and place it in the chalice. He then pours a small amount of unconsecrated red wine into the chalice which softens the dried particle as he hears the sick person's confession. Then, after saying the Prayers before Communion, he administers Holy Communion in both kinds to the sick person using the spoon, exactly as is done during the Divine Liturgy.

Lutheranism

Doctrine
The Lutheran Churches teach:

Practice
The Eucharist is administered by a Lutheran priest under both kinds, often at the chancel rails or in a communion line, after hosts and a common chalice are consecrated.

Anglicanism and Methodism

Doctrine
The 30th article of the 39 articles of the Church of England, as well as Article XIX of the Methodist Articles of Religion states:
"The Cup of the Lord is not to be denied to the lay-people: for both the parts of the Lord's Sacrament, by Christ's ordinance and commandment, ought to be ministered to all Christian men alike."

Practice

In Anglican and Methodist liturgy, the bread (typically in wafer form) is administered by licensed clergy into the cupped hands of the communicant, usually kneeling at the altar rail. The chalice may be administered by the clergy or, in certain dioceses, by licensed laypersons. The bread may be consumed before drinking the wine from the chalice or may be dipped into the wine prior to consuming (intinction).

Reformed

Doctrine
Communion under both kinds for the whole congregation was a central issue for the Protestant reformers, since they believed that it had been specifically commanded by Jesus at the Last Supper. John Calvin in his seminal 1536 work, Institutes of the Christian Religion, wrote; 'For Christ not only gave the cup, but appointed that the apostles should do so in future. For his words contain the command, "Drink ye all of it." And Paul relates, that it was so done, and recommends it as a fixed institution (First Epistle to the Corinthians )'.

Practice
Almost all Reformed churches practice communion under both kinds. One marked distinction in many Reformed churches is not using a chalice for the wine, but rather individual communion cups. In some churches wine is not used, but rather grape juice (see Alcohol in Christianity).

Latter Day Saints

In the Latter Day Saint movement the sacrament of the Lord's Supper is taken under both kinds, similar to Protestant usage. As originally practiced by the Latter Day Saint movement founder Joseph Smith and other early Latter Day Saints, the sacrament included the use of fermented wine.

Based on a document that Latter Day Saints believed was a revelation to Joseph Smith, however, it has been acceptable for Latter Day Saints to use other substances in the sacrament. As stated in the document: "It mattereth not what ye shall eat or what ye shall drink when ye partake of the sacrament, if it so be that ye do it with an eye single to my glory—remembering unto the Father my body which was laid down for you, and my blood which was shed for the remission of your sins." As a result of this revelation and anti-alcohol sentiment, the common practice of the Church of Jesus Christ of Latter-day Saints since the early 20th century has been to use bread and water and not to involve wine or grape juice. The second largest church to emerge from the early Latter Day Saint movement, the Community of Christ (formerly the Reorganized Church of Jesus Christ of Latter Day Saints), generally uses unfermented grape juice and whole wheat bread.

See also

Lovefeast

References

Eucharist